Trooper first class is a rank used by several state police agencies within the United States and in some world militaries.

In particular, in the Louisiana State Police, it is a rank below senior trooper, yet above trooper.  The insignia for this rank consists of a gold colored 'TFC' collar pin worn on the wearer's right lapel. Troopers who complete five (5) years of satisfactory or exceptional service are promoted to the rank of trooper first class. After attaining this rank, the trooper first becomes eligible to test for a supervisory position as a sergeant.  The title of address is trooper or trooper first class.

Usage in other agencies or countries may vary.

See also
Senior Trooper
Trooper
Police ranks of the United States

References

Police ranks